Thomas William Brown (born December 12, 1940) is a former professional football player and major league baseball player.

Brown briefly played for the Washington Senators of the American League early in the 1963 season, and then was a defensive back in the National Football League for six seasons with the Green Bay Packers and Washington Redskins.  He played college football at the University of Maryland in College Park, where he also played for the baseball team.

Early years
Born in Laureldale, Pennsylvania, Brown graduated from Montgomery Blair High School in Silver Spring, Maryland, a suburb north of Washington, D.C.  He then went to the University of Maryland in nearby College Park and played both baseball and football for the Terrapins.

Baseball career
Brown played outfield and first base for the Washington Senators in 1963. A switch hitter who threw left-handed, he was signed to a minor league contract in late February, played extremely well in spring training, batting .312, and earned a spot on the major league team. In the regular season, Brown batted a meek .147 in 61 games (23 as a starter), with 17 hits in 116 at bats, one home run, and four runs batted in. Sent down to the minors, he played parts of two seasons (1963–1964) in the Senators' farm system with the York White Roses of the Class AA Eastern League; in 470 at bats, he batted .223 with eight home runs and 47 RBI. He was recalled up to the big club in September 1963, when he hit his sole homer.

Brown left the York team in early July 1964, after signing with the Green Bay Packers.

Football career
Brown was selected in the second round (28th overall) of the 1963 NFL draft by the Packers, and twentieth overall in the AFL draft by the Buffalo Bills. After his stint in baseball with the Senators, he played defensive back for Green Bay from 1964 through 1968 and for the Washington Redskins in 1969.

In the 1966 NFL title game at the Cotton Bowl in Dallas, Brown  intercepted a fourth-down pass in the end zone by quarterback Don Meredith in the final minute, preserving the Packers' 34–27 victory over the Cowboys. He was part of the Packers' unprecedented three consecutive NFL championship teams under Vince Lombardi which concluded with victories in the first two Super Bowls.

He was traded to Washington in February 1969, the first trade by new Redskins head coach Lombardi. Brown played in only one game for the Redskins, the opener against New Orleans, and then had shoulder surgery. He was waived by the team in late August 1970, a week prior to Lombardi's death from cancer.

Brown finished his NFL career with 13 interceptions and six fumble recoveries, including one for a touchdown, and also returned 27 punts and 7 kickoffs. His head coach for five seasons was Lombardi, four in Green Bay and one in Washington; the exception was in 1968, after Lombardi stepped down and was succeeded by Phil Bengtson. Brown led the Packers that season with four interceptions.

Personal life
From 1989 to 2015, Brown ran a little league in Salisbury, Maryland for children ages 5–12 called Tom Brown's Rookie League. The league was open to many ages. The sports included in the league were flag football, baseball and basketball.

Video
You Tube – Tom Brown: Backup plan

References

External links

1969 football card
Tom Brown Rookie League – About Tom Brown

1940 births
All-American college baseball players
American football safeties
Green Bay Packers players
Living people
Maryland Terrapins baseball players
Maryland Terrapins football players
People from Berks County, Pennsylvania
Players of American football from Pennsylvania
Washington Redskins players
Washington Senators (1961–1971) players
York White Roses players